Best Coast Jazz is an album by American jazz trumpeter Clifford Brown featuring tracks recorded in 1954 and released on the EmArcy label. Further tracks from the same sessions were released as Clifford Brown All Stars in 1956 following Brown's untimely death.

Reception 

AllMusic awarded the album 4½ stars and Scott Yanow, in his review, states "fine solos all around but Brownie's closing statement cuts everyone".

Track listing 
 "Coronado" (Johnny Coles) – 19:46   
 "You Go to My Head" (J. Fred Coots, Haven Gillespie) – 17:12

Personnel 
 Clifford Brown – trumpet
 Herb Geller, Joe Maini – alto saxophone
 Walter Benton – tenor saxophone 
 Kenny Drew – piano
 Curtis Counce – bass
 Max Roach – drums

References 

1955 albums
Clifford Brown albums
EmArcy Records albums